Neston is a civil parish in Cheshire West and Chester, England. It contains 76 buildings that are recorded in the National Heritage List for England as designated listed buildings.  Of these, five are listed at Grade II*, the middle grade, and the others are at Grade II. In addition to the village of Neston, it contains the settlements of Parkgate, Little Neston, and Ness. Outside the villages, the parish is rural. Most of the listed buildings are houses, or related to farming. The other listed buildings include churches and associated structures, a public house, a converted windmill, a former school and its chapel, a bridge over a disused railway, a war memorial, and a telephone kiosk.

Key

Buildings

See also

Listed buildings in Gayton
Listed buildings in Heswall
Listed buildings in Raby
Listed buildings in Thornton Hough
Listed buildings in Willaston

References
Citations

Sources

Listed buildings in Cheshire West and Chester
Lists of listed buildings in Cheshire
Listed